You Had Me at Hello is the debut full-length album released by the metalcore band Bury Your Dead in 2003. The title comes from a line of romantic dialogue in the movie Jerry Maguire. In 2005, the album was re-issued at Eulogy Recordings, with new album artwork, and labels the current band members on the disc.

Track listing

"Mosh n' Roll", "Tuesday Night Fever", and "So Fucking Blues" were re-recorded as "Losin' It", "Mission: Impossible", and "Mission: Impossible 2" for the band's 2004 follow-up Cover Your Tracks.

Personnel
Joe Krewko - vocals
Brendan "Slim" MacDonald - guitar
Dan O'Connor - guitar
Steve Kent - bass
Mark Castillo - drums

References

2003 debut albums
Bury Your Dead albums
Eulogy Recordings albums